Jonathan Andrew Ship (born 23 April 1981) is an English cricketer. Ship is a left-handed batsman. He was born at West Bromwich, Staffordshire.

Ship represented the Warwickshire Cricket Board in a single List A match against Cumberland in the 1st round of the 2002 Cheltenham & Gloucester Trophy which was held in 2001 at St George's Road, Millom. In his only List A match, he scored 5 runs.

He currently plays club cricket for Sutton Coldfield Cricket Club.

References

External links
Jonathan Ship at Cricinfo
Jonathan Ship at CricketArchive

1981 births
Living people
Sportspeople from West Bromwich
Sportspeople from Staffordshire
English cricketers
Warwickshire Cricket Board cricketers